The Ethiopian Heritage Fund is a British charity that works to preserve the antiquities and manuscripts of Ethiopian Orthodox monasteries.

References

External links

Historic preservation
History of Ethiopia
Cultural charities based in the United Kingdom
Foreign charities operating in Ethiopia